Choreutis yakushimensis is a moth in the family Choreutidae. It was described by Nobukatsu Marumo in 1923. It is found in Japan and Taiwan.

References

Choreutis
Moths described in 1923